Sjuhollendarbukta (English: Seven Hollander Bay) is a bay on the western coast of the island of Jan Mayen. The Austrian Emil von Wohlgemuth (1886), who surveyed Jan Mayen, named the bay 7 Holländer Bucht, mistakenly believing it was the site of the wintering of seven Dutch whalers in 1633–34.

References

 Norwegian Polar Institute Place Names of Svalbard Database

Landforms of Jan Mayen
Bays of Norway